Aigars Šķēle (born December 4, 1992) is a professional basketball player for Stal Ostrów Wielkopolski of the Polish Basketball League (PLK).

Playing career
Šķēle spent couple of seasons in Spain, playing for Baloncesto Fuenlabrada youth teams, before returning to his home country in 2012. He played one season for Barons, then joined Jūrmala for the 2013-14 season. Šķēle helped Jūrmala to reach Latvian League semifinals for the first time in club history.

On August 11, 2014, he moved to VEF Rīga.

On January 7, 2015, he was loaned to BK Valmiera

On June 11, 2021, he has signed with s.Oliver Würzburg of the German Basketball Bundesliga.

On August 11, 2022, he has signed with Stal Ostrów Wielkopolski of the Polish Basketball League (PLK).

Personal
His older brother, Armands, is also a professional basketball player.

References

External links
FIBA Europe Profile
VEF Rīga Player Profile

1992 births
Living people
Basketball players from Riga
BC Kalev/Cramo players
BK Barons players
BK Jūrmala players
BK Valmiera players
BK VEF Rīga players
BK Ventspils players
Latvian expatriate basketball people in Germany
Latvian expatriate basketball people in Estonia
Latvian expatriate basketball people in France
Latvian men's basketball players
Olympique Antibes basketball players
Point guards
S.Oliver Würzburg players
Shooting guards
Stal Ostrów Wielkopolski players